Rafael is a Mexican telenovela produced by Televisa and transmitted by Telesistema Mexicano in 1970.

Cast 
Enrique Aguilar as Rafael
Estela Chacón 
Angelines Fernández
Belém Diaz

References

External links 

Mexican telenovelas
1970 telenovelas
Televisa telenovelas
Spanish-language telenovelas
1970 Mexican television series debuts
1970 Mexican television series endings